Ian Antony Dickison  (born 9 March 1952) is a former New Zealand lawn and indoor bowler.

Bowls career
Dickison came to prominence after being selected ahead of Peter Belliss for the 1986 Commonwealth Games in Edinburgh, Scotland. The decision by the New Zealand selectors proved to be right when Dickison secured the gold medal, defeating Ian Schuback of Australia in the final.

Dickison then won the 1988 Outdoor World Championship triples gold medal with Morgan Moffat and Phil Skoglund.

He won two medals at the 1989 Asia Pacific Bowls Championships in Suva, Fiji.

Other achievements include winning the singles title at the New Zealand National Bowls Championships in 1985 and the pairs title in 1981 bowling for the Kaikorai Bowls Club.

Honours and awards
In the 1988 Queen's Birthday Honours, Dickison was appointed a Member of the Order of the British Empire, for services to bowls, and in 1990 he was awarded the New Zealand 1990 Commemoration Medal. In 2013, he was an inaugural inductee into the Bowls New Zealand Hall of Fame.

References

 Profile at the New Zealand Olympic Committee website

1952 births
Living people
New Zealand male bowls players
New Zealand Members of the Order of the British Empire
Commonwealth Games gold medallists for New Zealand
Bowls players at the 1986 Commonwealth Games
Commonwealth Games medallists in lawn bowls
Bowls World Champions
Bowls players at the 1982 Commonwealth Games
Medallists at the 1986 Commonwealth Games